San Antonio International was an American soccer club based in San Antonio, Texas that was a member of the Lone Star Soccer Alliance.

The club was known as the San Antonio Alamo in their final season.

Year-by-year

References

Sports teams in San Antonio
Defunct soccer clubs in Texas
Lone Star Soccer Alliance teams